Dreaming Out Loud is a 1940 American film based on the radio series Lum and Abner, directed by Harold Young starring Chester Lauck and Norris Goff. It is also known as Money Isn't Everything.

Plot summary

This time around, Lum Edwards (Chester Lauck) and Abner Peabody (Norris Goff), the two elderly men owning the Jot 'Em Down general store which is the centre of life in Pineridge, Arkansas, try to lend a helping hand to their unfortunate town neighbors. An alcoholic, Wes Stillman (Irving Bacon), loses his daughter Effie Lou (Sheila Sheldon) in a traffic accident, when she is hit by a passing car. Wes is beyond himself with grief and cannot stop blaming himself for not taking better care of her. In order to bring relief to Wes, Lum and Abner see to it that Wes is appointed deputy sheriff, and in charge of putting traffic offenders to justice. Wes gets to serve as deputy directly under police Constable Caleb Weehunt (Robert McKenzie).

Another neighbor in distress is up next. The store also serves as the town's post office, where Alice is working as post-mistress. Doctor Kenneth Barnes (Robert Wilcox), son of Doctor Walter "Doc Walt" Barnes (Frank Craven, cannot marry his fiancé Alice (Frances Langford), because her aunt Jessica Spencer (Clara Blandick) demands she make a better choice financially - and she has a feud with Doc Walt. Kenneth is working as a doctor in the next town; but, doesn't make enough to support a wife and their younger brother; so, they have to wait. Lum and Abner try to get the doctor a mobile medical unit which would let him support his wife and her younger brother Jimmy (Bobs Watson) when he arrives from his present working place in Adamstown. But the wealthy aunt doesn't budge because she doesn't approve of Doc Walt. When Jimmy falls very ill with pneumonia, Doc Walt saves his life, using a special oxygen inhalator that he himself invented. Doc Walt dies (?) in his efforts to save the boy. Ridden by guilt, Aunt Jessica finally coughs up the money to buy Ken a mobile medical unit, so that he can save more lives. Soon after, the person who hit Effie Lou is caught and arrested. It turns out it was Jessica's secretary Will Danielson (Donald Briggs).

Cast
Chester Lauck as Lum Edwards
Norris Goff as Abner Peabody
Frances Langford as Alice
Frank Craven as Dr. Walter Barnes
Bobs Watson as Jimmy
Irving Bacon as Wes Stillman
Clara Blandick as Jessica Spencer
Robert Wilcox as Dr. Kenneth Barnes
Donald Briggs as Will Danielson
Robert McKenzie as Constable Caleb Weeunt
Phil Harris as Peter Atkinson
Sheila Sheldon as Effie Lou Stillman
Troy Brown Jr. as Washington

Soundtrack
Frances Langford - "Dreaming out Loud" (By Sam Coslow)

External links

References

1940 films
Films based on radio series
American black-and-white films
1940 comedy films
Films directed by Harold Young (director)
Films set in Arkansas
RKO Pictures films
American comedy films
1940s English-language films
1940s American films
Lum and Abner